is a commercial development in Izumisano, Osaka, Japan, adjacent to Kansai International Airport. It was constructed in the early 1990s on reclaimed land, and opened in September 1995.

Rinku Town is accessible from Osaka by the Nankai Main Line and JR Hanwa Line. All train services to and from Kansai Airport (except Kansai Airport Limited Express Haruka services) stop at Rinkū Town Station.

Landmarks
 Rinku Gate Tower Building - third-tallest building in Japan (after the Abeno Harukas, Yokohama Landmark Tower)
 Rinku Premium Outlets shopping mall
 Rinku Pleasure Town Seacle commercial facility
 Big Ferris wheel - 280 feet high
 Marble Beach - Beach filled with white marble stones
 Tajiri Sky Bridge - Cable-stayed bridge
 Japan Foundation Japanese Language Institute Kansai

External links
 Osaka Prefecture - Rinku Town website
 Osaka Prefecture - Rinku Town Guide
 Izumisano City Sightseeing 
 Tourist Information Center "Rinku-Machidokoro"

Izumisano
Tourist attractions in Osaka
Buildings and structures in Osaka Prefecture
Populated places established in 1995
1995 establishments in Japan